Teater Galeasen is an independent Swedish theatre group based at Skeppsholmen in Stockholm. It was founded in 1983.

Teater Galeasen is known for their singular, avant-garde and experimental productions of both classic and contemporary dramatic work. They work with freelance actors and directors.

External links
 Teater Galeasen (official site - non-English)

Galeasen
1983 establishments in Sweden